The 46th Annual American Music Awards were held on October 9, 2018, at the Microsoft Theater in Los Angeles, California. It aired live on ABC and was hosted by Tracee Ellis Ross. Cardi B and Drake led the list of nominations with eight mentions each. Taylor Swift and Camila Cabello were the big winners, with four awards each. The late rapper and singer XXXTentacion won Favorite Soul/R&B album nearly four months after his death. His mother, Cleopatra Bernard, accepted the award.

Performances

Notes
  Broadcast live from Sydney, Australia.
  With musical director Ricky Minor.

Presenters

Bebe Rexha and Florida Georgia Line - presented Favorite Rap/Hip-Hop Artist
Amber Heard - introduced Twenty One Pilots
Macaulay Culkin- presented Favorite Pop/Rock Male Artist
Heidi Klum - presented Tour of the Year
Chloe x Halle - introduced Mariah Carey
John Stamos and Busy Philipps - presented Favorite Soul/R&B Male Artist
Tracee Ellis Ross - introduced Cardi B, Bad Bunny & J Balvin
Ashlee Simpson and Evan Ross - presented Favorite Pop/Rock Song
Sara Gilbert and Thomas Rhett - presented Favorite Country Female Artist
Normani and Liza Koshy - introduced Benny Blanco, Khalid and Halsey
Billy Eichner and Kathryn Hahn - presented Favorite Adult Contemporary Artist
Constance Wu and Rita Ora - presented Favorite Pop/Rock Duo or Group
The Chainsmokers and Kelsea Ballerini - introduced Post Malone and Ty Dolla Sign
Vanessa Hudgens - introduced Jennifer Lopez
Lauren Daigle and Kane Brown - presented Favorite Soul/R&B album
Amandla Stenberg - presented Favorite Pop/Rock Album
Taran Killam and Leighton Meester - presented Favorite Country Male Artist
Tracee Ellis Ross - introduced Ciara and Missy Elliott
Tyra Banks - presented New Artist of the Year
Tracee Ellis Ross - introduced Carrie Underwood
Rami Malek, Joseph Mazzello and Gwilym Lee - introduced Panic! at the Disco
Lenny Kravitz - presented Artist of the Year

Winners and nominees

References

2018 awards in the United States
2018 in American music
2018 in Los Angeles
2018 music awards
2018
October 2018 events in the United States